Përparim Hetemaj (born 12 December 1986) is a Finnish professional footballer who plays as a midfielder for Veikkausliiga club HJK. Born in modern-day Kosovo, Hetemaj arrived in Finland when he was 6 years old and played for HJK's youth teams; signing a professional contract in 2004 at age 17. He joined Greek side AEK Athens in 2006, and moved to Twente in 2009. Subsequently, in 2010, he was signed by Brescia and was transferred to Chievo in 2011. Hetemaj played 300 matches in the Serie A before returning to Finland in 2022 after a season with Reggina in the Serie B.

Hetemaj made his international debut for Finland in February 2009, at the age of 22, and made 50 appearances, including appearing in 2014 and 2018 FIFA World Cup qualifications, before his retirement from international football in 2018.

Early and personal life
Of Kosovo Albanian ethnicity, Hetemaj was born in Skenderaj, SAP Kosovo, which was part of SR Serbia, SFR Yugoslavia at the time, and moved to Finland in 1992. His family first arrived at Oulu but they moved to Helsinki due to his father Miftar suffering from asthma. He has a younger brother, the footballer Mehmet, and two sisters, Fatlume and Fatbardhe. In 2004, he acquired Finnish citizenship.

Club career

HJK Helsinki
Hetemaj started his career at the youth academy of HJK Helsinki, and in 2004 played for its second team, Klubi-04, in 26 Ykkönen—the second tier of Finnish football—matches, in which he scored six goals. He played 26 matches and scored a goal in the 2005–06 season of Veikkausliiga—the premier division of Finnish football. After playing seven matches for HJK during the 2006–07, he was sold to AEK Athens for a fee of €450.000.

AEK Athens
Hetemaj made his AEK Athens debut on 26 September 2006 in a 1–1 draw against Anderlecht in the UEFA Champions League. After seven matches, Hetemaj's 2006–07 season ended on 8 February 2007, when he suffered a fractured leg after a tackle by Kevin Thomson during a friendly match between the Finnish and Scottish national teams.

He was again on playing condition in October 2007, but he did not play for AEK and in January 2008 he was loaned to Apollon Kalamarias until the end of the season to gain more playing experience. He scored his first goal in the Superleague Greece on 23 February 2008 against Asteras Tripoli. He played a total of eight matches for Apollon Kalamarias in the 2007–08, and for the following season Hetemaj played nine league matches with AEK. Unsatisfied, Hetemaj asks to be transferred,

Twente
On 31 August 2009, Hetemaj signed a 1+1 year contract with Dutch club FC Twente as part of an exchange deal for Youssouf Hersi. Hetemaj started the season 2009–10 in the reserve team but was unable to break through to the first team that won the Eredivisie.

Brescia
Even before having played a match for Twente, On 1 February 2010, Hetemaj was signed by Italian club Brescia on a free transfer. Hetemaj only played four matches in 2009–10 Serie B; Brescia was promoted to Serie A and he signed a three-year contract. He made his Serie A debut on 12 September 2010, playing the full minutes in a 3–2 home victory over Palermo. He scored his first Serie A goal on 22 September 2010 against Roma, becoming the first Finnish footballer to score in Serie A and arousing Roma's interest in him. Hetemaj went on to score again in a 3–1 victory against Bologna.

Chievo
On 30 June 2011, Hetemaj signed for Serie A side Chievo in a co-ownership deal for €1.4 million. As a result, he chose the number 56 shirt number at the club. He made his debut for Chievo on 11 September 2011 against Novara, when he provided an assist to Cyril Théréau score the second goal of Chievo in the drawn. At the end of the season and after 32 league matches, Chievo bought Hetemaj's full rights on 18 June 2012 for an additional €800,000. In the 2012–13 season and the 2013–2014, Hetemaj played 30 and 32 league matches respectively and did not score in any competition. Hetemaj marked his 100th appearance for Chievo on 22 August 2014 in a 1–0 defeat against Pescara in the Coppa Italia. After four years at Chievo and 130 Serie A matches, he scored his first goal for the club on 12 September 2015 in a 1–1 draw against Juventus.

Benevento
On 2 September 2019, Hetemaj signed a two-year contract with the Serie B club Benevento.

Reggina
On 28 July 2021, Hetemaj joined Serie B side Reggina on a one-year deal.

Return to HJK
On 21 April 2022, Hetemaj returned to HJK and signed a two-year contract with an option for a third.

International career

Youth
Hetemaj was first drafted to play for Finland U19 on 7 September 2004 for a match against Sweden in Vihti. He made four appearances in the U19 team and scored two goals. Hetemaj made his debut for the U21 side on 13 April 2005 against Estonia. Hetemaj, along with his brother Mehmet, was called up to represent Finland at the 2009 UEFA European Under-21 Football Championship and he played in all the three matches which Finland played.

Senior
Hetemaj made his senior debut for Finland as an 84th-minute substitute against Japan on 4 February 2009 in a 5–1 loss. He gained his first UEFA European Championship qualifying game on 3 June 2011 when Mixu Paatelainen chose him to the starting line up against San Marino. On 26 May 2012, he scored his first national goal—a last-minute goal—against Turkey in a friendly match, which assured a 3−2 victory for Finland.

Përparim Hetemaj was part of Finland squad in 2018 FIFA World Cup qualification. Thus, despite having a chance to switch to represent Kosovo, his Finland cap in the qualification effectively locked him to represent Finland only. His brother Mehmet played once for Kosovo before the Football Federation of Kosovo became a member of UEFA and FIFA. However, he also lost the eligibility for Kosovo after played for Finland after Kosovo became a member.

On 8 January 2018, Hetemaj announced that he would retire from international duty.

Outside football

Charity work
As of 2015, Hetemaj occasionally helps football club of his birthplace, Drenica, and he usually helps with different monetary means as well as technical means.

Career statistics

Club

International

Scores and results list Finland's goal tally first, score column indicates score after each Hetemaj goal.

Honours
HJK Helsinki
 Veikkausliiga: 2022
 Finnish Cup: 2006

Benevento
 Serie B: 2019-20

Finland
 Baltic Cup runner-up: 2012; third place: 2014

References

External links

 Perparim Hetemaj at A.C. ChievoVerona 
 Perparim Hetemaj – SPL competition record
 
 
 
 
 
 

1986 births
Living people
Sportspeople from Skenderaj
Kosovan emigrants to Finland
Naturalized citizens of Finland
Association football midfielders
Finnish footballers
Finland international footballers
Finland under-21 international footballers
Kosovan footballers
Helsingin Jalkapalloklubi players
Klubi 04 players
AEK Athens F.C. players
Apollon Pontou FC players
FC Twente players
Brescia Calcio players
A.C. ChievoVerona players
Benevento Calcio players
Reggina 1914 players
Veikkausliiga players
Super League Greece players
Serie A players
Serie B players
Finnish expatriate footballers
Kosovan expatriate footballers
Expatriate footballers in Greece
Finnish expatriate sportspeople in Greece
Kosovan expatriate sportspeople in Greece
Expatriate footballers in the Netherlands
Finnish expatriate sportspeople in the Netherlands
Kosovan expatriate sportspeople in the Netherlands
Expatriate footballers in Italy
Finnish expatriate sportspeople in Italy
Kosovan expatriate sportspeople in Italy
Finnish people of Albanian descent
Finland youth international footballers
Finnish people of Kosovan descent